This is a list of albums released by Nickelodeon Records, including studio albums, extended plays, soundtrack albums, compilation albums, video albums, and remix albums released by the label.

Albums (1990s)

Albums (2000s)

Albums (2010s)

Albums (2020s)

References

Discographies of American record labels